Allodynerus rossii is a species of wasp in the family Vespidae. It was described by Amédée Louis Michel Lepeletier in 1841 and listed in Catalogue of Life: 2011 Annual Checklist.

References

Potter wasps
Taxa named by Amédée Louis Michel le Peletier